Leistarcha tenuistria is a moth in the family Xyloryctidae. It was described by Turner in 1935. It is found in Australia, where it has been recorded from New South Wales, Queensland and Victoria.

The wingspan is about 30 mm. The forewings are fuscous, with numerous fine white longitudinal streaks. These are closely applied so as to form costal median and dorsal bundles. From the end of the cell, these are replaced by two broad bundles, the first to the apex end of the costa, the second to the lower two-thirds of the termen. The hindwings are grey.

References

Leistarcha
Moths described in 1935